Chippewa Valley Technical College is one of the 16 technical and community colleges in the Wisconsin Technical College System, centered in Eau Claire, Wisconsin. It serves an 11-county area, with its largest campus in Eau Claire (actually home to three separate campuses: Clairemont, Gateway, and West) and major regional centers in Chippewa Falls, Menomonie, Neillsville and River Falls.

The school offers associate degree and technical diploma programs, as well as other certifications and adult continuing education programs. In the 2004–05 school year, 6,306 students were enrolled in programs and 15,978 students in continuing education.

CVTC's president is Sunem Beaton-Garcia.

See also 
 Eau Claire Vocational School Building

References

External links
Official Chippewa Valley Technical College website
Wisconsin Technical College System website

Wisconsin technical colleges
Buildings and structures in Eau Claire, Wisconsin
Education in Chippewa County, Wisconsin
Education in Eau Claire County, Wisconsin
Education in Clark County, Wisconsin
Education in Dunn County, Wisconsin
Education in Pierce County, Wisconsin